Everex ("Ever for Excellence!") is a defunct American manufacturer of desktop and notebook personal computers. It was established in 1983 and headquartered in Fremont, California. The company was founded by Steve Hui, John Lee and Wayne Cheung. In 1988, Everex was the leader in tape backup sales with half of the world market. On January 5, 1993 the company filed for bankruptcy and was purchased by Formosa Plastics Group, hence becoming part of a multinational conglomerate alongside companies like First International Computer, the world's leading motherboard manufacturer. On December 29, 2006 Everex Systems, Inc filed a voluntary petition for liquidation under Chapter 7, and in June 2008 NewMarket Technology has taken control of Everex.

History 

In 1983, Everex shipped its first hard drive, tape backup and graphics products. Seven years later, with an ever expanding product line, annual revenues totaled over $436 million and the workforce topped 2,200 employees. In 1985, Everex began shipping personal computers under private labels, such as the popular IBM-AT compatible System 1800. Three years later the STEP computer line launched, introducing cutting edge 286 and 386-based computing to a mass audience. In addition to computer systems, high-performance file servers and a UNIX-based operating system (ESIX), the company produced tape drives, graphics boards, data and fax modems, network boards, memory enhancement and desktop publishing products, controllers for disk and tape drivers, and monitors.

 1983 - Everex founded in Fremont, California
 1984 - First Everex hard disk drive shipped
 1986 - 286-Based STEP line of computers launched
 1987 - Everex IPO under NASDAQ "EVRX"
 1992 - Discussed a merger with Northgate Computers but these talks failed.
 1993 - Everex files for Chapter 11 bankruptcy protection. They sell their Esix brand to James River Group for $210,000 and their storage division to Exabyte for $5.5M.
 1993 - Everex purchased by the Formosa Plastics Group
 1998 - Everex launches FreeStyle, the world's first Windows CE PDA, but abandoned the line later in the year
 2007 - Everex launches its first 17" widescreen Vista notebook 
 2007 - Everex launches low-cost green PC Impact GC3502 running gOS
 2007 - Everex announces plans for sub-$300 Linux notebooks
 2008 - Everex launches a series of low cost "green" systems, the CloudBook UMPC, the gBook notebook, and the gPC mini Mac mini-like desktop, all running the Ubuntu-based gOS Linux with the GNOME desktop environment. Everex is later acquired by systems integrator Newmarket Technology.
 2009 - The US subsidiary of Everex closes its doors, while the Japanese and Taiwanese subsidiaries seem to remain unaffected.

See also 
 Everex green computers
 First International Computer (FIC)
 Zonbu, some of whose computers are based on Everex hardware

References

External links
 Everex Company History

 
1983 establishments in California
2009 disestablishments in California
American companies established in 1983
American companies disestablished in 2009
Companies based in Fremont, California
Computer companies established in 1983
Computer companies disestablished in 2009
Defunct computer companies based in California
Defunct computer companies of the United States
Defunct computer hardware companies
Technology companies based in the San Francisco Bay Area